Batman: Three Jokers is an American comic book limited series published by DC Comics. It is a spiritual successor to Batman: The Killing Joke and Batman: A Death in the Family. The three-issue storyline was written by Geoff Johns and illustrated by Jason Fabok and Brad Anderson, began in August and concluded in October 2020. In Three Jokers, Batman, Batgirl and Red Hood follow a lead on the Joker, who appears to have been three different men all along.

The Three Jokers storyline was published under DC Black Label, an imprint allowing writers to present unique takes on DC characters for a mature audience. The storyline received positive reviews with praise for the art, story and character development despite criticism on the underdevelopment on Red Hood and Batgirl's story.

Premise
Three Jokers follows Batman investigating several ongoing crimes by the Joker occurring simultaneously, which may be related to the possibility that there may indeed be more than one.

The three Jokers in this story are referred to by simple titles:

 The Criminal, the pragmatic, philosophical, surprisingly serious Joker (initially implied to be the leader of the three, and the one who laughs the least, even claiming that laughing actually hurts him), whose appearance is reminiscent of his earliest, Golden Age Batman comic book appearances, i.e. Batman #1 (his pose in his first appearance in issue #1 is identical to a panel from his debut comic), and whose ultimate plan is to transform Joe Chill into a Joker clone worthy of being Batman's arch-nemesis, seeing how his murder of Bruce Wayne's parents, Thomas and Martha, gave Batman the most pain in his life.
 The Clown, the campy, colorful, showman-like prankster Joker from the Silver and Bronze Age comics (and thus, seemingly the silliest of the Jokers), who has a fondness for theatrics and embarks on criminal capers just for the attention he so craves; his activities and dialogue call back to Detective Comics #475 (he and his gang, including original sidekick Gagsworth A. Gagsworthy, battle Batman, Batgirl and Red Hood in an aquarium inhabited by Jokerized fish, to which the Joker once tried to obtain legal claim) and Batman: A Death in the Family (at the end of the first issue, he strongly implies that he was the Joker who bludgeoned Jason Todd as Robin in that story, and taunts Todd into killing him by claiming that Todd has now become a tool for the Joker with which to torment Batman by becoming the Red Hood, a moniker originally used by the Joker).
 The Comedian, the dangerous, depraved, sadistic psychopath Joker from the Modern Age (quite possibly the most evil of them all), who, behind his twisted sense of humor and creepy smile, is ultimately a malicious monster feeling nothing but spite for what he sees as a cruel, irredeemable world; relishes in personally torturing Batman and everyone he cares about, and personally scoffs at the idea of the Joker having a deeper meaning in regards to his rivalry with Batman; his appearance and attires seem to be based on the Joker as seen in Batman: The Killing Joke, as is the camera he uses to film a kidnapped Joe Chill (the same camera he used to photograph Barbara Gordon's naked, paralyzed body in that story).

Prelude
During the "Darkseid War" storyline, Batman sits on the Mobius Chair (a time-space/dimensional vehicle operated by the New God Metron) with Hal Jordan observing. First, to test the chair, Batman asked it who killed his parents - it answered correctly: "Joe Chill". Next, Batman asked the Mobius Chair what is the Joker's real name, and is shocked by the results. It is later revealed that the Mobius Chair told Batman there were three Jokers, which he later brought up to Hal when he asked about it. Batman states that he is going to have to look into that later.

Plot
While having his crime-fighting injuries tended to by Alfred, Batman recalls the history of all his major physical scars left by his foes, including the Joker. He leaves to find the Clown Prince of Crime when he learns he has killed the last remaining members of the Moxon crime family. Barbara Gordon learns about comedian Kelani Apaka also being killed by the Joker and likewise suits up as Batgirl to go after him. Red Hood (Jason Todd) resumes his pursuit of the Joker as well. Batman concludes that the Joker used the murders as a diversion, his real plan was stealing a truck full of his Joker-turning chemicals.

The Joker driving the stolen truck, The Clown, meets with The Comedian and The Criminal to discuss their plan to set up chemical vats and find candidates in order to create a fourth new Joker. Batman, Batgirl, and Red Hood's investigations lead them to an aquarium where they encounter The Clown, who Batman subdues and leaves for Batgirl and Red Hood to guard while he organizes a transport to Arkham Asylum. Jason kills The Clown after being provoked by him, enraging Barbara.

Batgirl tells Batman about Jason's actions. She wants Bruce to stop him, but he tells her there is nothing they can do about it: if Jason confesses to the murder, Batgirl would be arrested as an accomplice and unmasked, as she was there during the murder. They go to Blackgate Penitentiary: at the crime scene of the murder of Judge Walls, another of the Joker's victims, Batman found the fingerprints of one particular criminal: his parents' killer Joe Chill. They learn the incarcerated Chill has terminal cancer. 

Red Hood searches for the Joker at an abandoned sports club. Inside, he finds dozens of bodies bathed in a Joker-turning chemicals-filled pool. Jason is captured by the Jokers, who tell him they are searching for someone to turn into a better version of themselves to antagonize Batman. All the victims they killed were tests for their final product, but they were not good enough. The Jokers torture Jason and leave him for Barbara and Bruce to find. Jason snaps at Batman, blaming him for all the pain in his life. Barbara takes Jason to her apartment, where they emotionally confide with one another about their similar tragedies. They kiss, but Barbara breaks the moment. The Comedian kidnaps Joe Chill and records his confession about why he murdered the Waynes.

Bruce analyzes the Jokers and the fact that each one played a role in his career. The Criminal reminds him of their earliest encounters, while The Clown brings up memories of cartoonish, macabre showmanship ("a lethal campiness, like a children's show host"). The Comedian, with "a sadistic streak stronger than the others", links him to the Joker he has most recently faced. Batman believes that one of these is the original and created the other two. After learning of Joe Chill's kidnapping, Batman finds unsent apology letters to Bruce Wayne that the guilt-ridden Chill wrote long before he got sick.

Batman, Batgirl, and Red Hood head to the condemned Monarch Theater as inside the letters Batman finds a ticket for The Mark of Zorro, left by the Joker as an invitation. As they enter, a video about the confession of why Chill murdered the Waynes is projected on the screen. As both Barbara and Jason are occupied with several Jokerized goons, Batman faces The Criminal alone, who intends to turn Chill into the new Joker because of his role in the Dark Knight's creation. Batman saves Chill, who has learned his secret identity and thinks he would deserve it he chose to take his life, but Batman forgives him. The Criminal is then suddenly shot in the head by The Comedian.

Batman escorts the arrested Comedian (the real Joker) to Arkham Asylum. Jason tells Barbara that he would like to be more than friends with her, but she rejects him as she cannot get past the blood on Jason's hands. The Joker reveals that he is aware of Batman, Batgirl, and Red Hood's secret identities, and claims he does not want what the other two desired. The Clown just wanted to see people suffer which the Joker finds mundane, and The Criminal was delusional since the idea of creating a Joker with an identity is pointless; in his own view, the Joker is the personification of mystery and chaos. The Joker reveals he convinced the other two that Joe Chill would be the perfect Joker, because he understood he would never be able to commit a crime more tragic than what Chill did to Bruce, and he alone wants to be Bruce's greatest pain until the day they die together, which he accomplished when he forgave Chill.

Jason writes a letter for Barbara and tapes it to her apartment's front door. Inside the letter, he confesses his love for her and is ready to abandon the Red Hood identity for good, if it means having a chance to be with her. Barbara never reads the letter, as it falls from the door and is collected by a janitor. Since Jason notes in the letter that he also gives Barbara a chance to pretend this never happened, he is left unaware of this. In the aftermath, Bruce comforts Chill at his deathbed. Bruce reveals to Alfred that he's known the Joker's true name all along, discovering it one week after their first encounter. It is also revealed that the Joker's pregnant wife Jeannie was not actually killed, but taken to Alaska, where she now lives with her son as part of a witness protection program. Bruce explains that the Joker's name must never be known, because if the world ever found out that he had a family, it would be national news and they would be targeted, either by the Joker himself or by someone seeking vengeance against the criminal.

Canonicity
Geoff Johns, the writer of the book, stated at DC FanDome in September 2020 that he felt the story was "in continuity". He also debunked a theory that claimed the three Jokers were from different realities.

In the same month, Jason Fabok, the artist of the series, said that the canonicity of the series was subject to interpretation: "I'm not a continuity hound personally. I just want a good story. All my favorite stories are out of continuity so that appeals to me more. If this was in continuity we would have had our hands tied and forced to do certain things".

Reception
The series overall received positive reviews from critics. Many critics praised the art, pacing, and characters, as well as the resolution between Batman and Joe Chill. However, many critics found the revelation of the Three Jokers' identities underwhelming. The romance of Jason Todd and Barbara Gordon was seen as underdeveloped. Critics praised the execution of Joker's "true" name.

According to the Review aggregator, Comic Book roundup gave the entire series 8.5 out of 10 based on 61 reviews.

Sequel
In November 2020, CBR.com reported that Geoff Johns confirmed that he and Jason Fabok were working on a sequel to Batman: Three Jokers.

References

2020 in comics
Batman titles
Joker (character) titles
DC Comics limited series